Benediction Ignite is a professional road bicycle racing team which participates in elite races. The team was established in 2005, before becoming UCI registered in 2018, in preparation for the 2019 season.

The team roster previously featured a number of notable Rwandan cyclists: 2018 Rwandan cyclist of the year Patrick Byukusenge, 2015 Tour of Rwanda winner Jean Bosco Nsengimana, 2016 national road champion Bonaventure Uwizeyimana, 2017 national road champion Gasore Hategeka and reigning national champion Didier Munyaneza.

Team roster

References

External links

Cycling teams established in 2005
UCI Continental Teams (Africa)
Cycling teams based in Rwanda